The Road Back, also translated as The Way Back, is a novel by German author Erich Maria Remarque, commonly regarded as a sequel to his 1929 novel All Quiet on the Western Front. It was first serialized in the German newspaper Vossische Zeitung between December 1930 and January 1931, and published in book form in April 1931.

Plot 
Although the book follows different characters from those in All Quiet on the Western Front, it can be assumed that they were in the same company, as the characters recall other characters from the earlier novel. Tjaden is the only member of the 2nd Company to feature prominently in both books. 

Set a few weeks after the end of All Quiet on the Western Front, the novel deals with the fall of the German Empire and details the experience of young men in Germany who have returned from the trenches of World War I and are trying to integrate back into civilian life. Its most salient feature is the main characters' pessimism about contemporary society which, they feel, is morally bankrupt because it has allegedly caused the war and apparently does not wish to reform itself.

Reception 
The book was banned during Nazi rule.

Adaptations
1937, The Road Back – motion picture directed by James Whale and starring, among others, Noah Beery Jr. and Richard Cromwell.

English translations 
 Arthur Wesley Wheen, as The Road Back. Published in 1931 by Little, Brown, and Company, McClelland & Stewart and G.P. Putnam and Co.
 Brian Murdoch, as The Way Back. Published in 2019 by Vintage Classics, .

References 

1931 German novels
Novels by Erich Maria Remarque
Novels set during World War I
Novels first published in serial form
Works originally published in Vossische Zeitung
Novels set in Germany
Anti-war novels
Sequel novels
German novels adapted into films
All Quiet on the Western Front